The Sage Hen is a 1921 American silent Western film directed by Edgar Lewis and starring Gladys Brockwell, Wallace MacDonald, and Richard Headrick.

Cast
 Gladys Brockwell as The Sage Hen 
 Wallace MacDonald as Her Son, as a Man 
 Richard Headrick as Her Son, as a Boy 
 Lillian Rich as Stella Sanson 
 Alfred Allen as John Rudd 
 Jim Mason as Craney 
 Arthur Morrison as Grote

References

Bibliography
 George A. Katchmer. Eighty Silent Film Stars: Biographies and Filmographies of the Obscure to the Well Known. McFarland, 1991.

External links

 

1921 films
1921 Western (genre) films
Films directed by Edgar Lewis
1920s English-language films
Pathé Exchange films
American black-and-white films
Silent American Western (genre) films
1920s American films